Petoskey High School is a public, magnet high school located in Petoskey, Michigan. Petoskey High School, a part of the Public Schools of Petoskey school district, offers a complementary mix of academic, athletic and leadership opportunities for enrolled students. The alternative public high school in Petoskey is Concord Academy, a K–12 public charter school focused on integration between the arts and academics.

History 
The original building of Petoskey High School was completed in 1914 at the southeast corner of State and Howard Streets in downtown Petoskey. In 1930, the building today known as Central Elementary was added to the high school building as a junior high. In 1966, the current Petoskey High School building was constructed due to extreme overcrowding at the former building, which had since become the junior high school building. In 1991, the junior high (now middle school) moved out of the older building and into a new one near the current high school. In 1999, the old high school building was demolished, leaving Central Elementary in the current location.

Attendance boundary
In Emmet County the district (and therefore the high school's attendance boundary) includes, in addition to Petoskey: Bay View, Conway, and a portion of Oden. Townships include Bear Creek Township, Resort Township, Springvale Township, and sections of Little Traverse Township and Littlefield Township. A portion of the district is in Charlevoix County, where it includes Walloon Lake. Townships covered include portions of Chandler Township, Hayes Township, and Melrose Township.

Demographics 
The demographic breakdown of the 997 students enrolled in 2018–19 was:

 Male – 49.6%
 Female – 50.4%
 Native American – 3.8%
 Asian – 1.0%
 Black – 0.8%
 Hispanic – 1.9%
 Native Hawaiian/Pacific Islander – 0.3%
 White – 86.5%
 Multiracial – 5.7%

In addition, 34.5% of students were eligible for reduced-price or free lunch.

MHSAA championships

 Boys Soccer – 1995, 2008
 Wrestling – 1996
 Boys Tennis – 2002 (co-champions)
 Boys Skiing – 1982, 1984, 1987, 1998, 2000, 2001, 2002, 2004, 2005, 2007, 2008, 2011, 2012, 2013, 2014, 2015, 2016, 2017, 2018, 2020, 2021, 2022
 Girls Skiing – 1980, 1981, 1982, 1984, 1991, 1992, 1993, 1994, 1996, 1997, 2008, 2011, 2013
 Girls Cross Country - 2020
 Girls Track & Field - 2021

Notable people
Steve Sebo – Former coach here, 1937–1939.
Mark Smolinski – football coach here
Trevor Huffman, class of 1998. All-time leading scorer for Kent State University Men’s Basketball, professional basketball player

References

External links
Public Schools of Petoskey Homepage

Public high schools in Michigan
Schools in Emmet County, Michigan
School buildings completed in 1966
1914 establishments in Michigan